The Marriage Swindler (German:Heiratsschwindler) is a 1925 German silent drama film directed by Carl Boese and starring Reinhold Schünzel, Käthe Haack and Evi Eva.

The film's sets were designed by the art director Kurt Richter.

Cast
In alphabetical order
 Uschi Elleot 
 Adolphe Engers 
 Evi Eva 
 Erika Glässner 
 Käthe Haack 
 Margarete Kupfer 
 Erna Morena 
 Reinhold Schünzel 
 Rosa Valetti

References

Bibliography
 Grange, William. Cultural Chronicle of the Weimar Republic. Scarecrow Press, 2008.

External links

1925 films
Films of the Weimar Republic
Films directed by Carl Boese
German silent feature films
German crime drama films
German black-and-white films
1925 crime drama films
Silent drama films
1920s German films